Daniel Sean Preston (born 26 September 1991) is an English footballer who plays as a defender for  club Bedworth United.

Playing career

Birmingham City
Preston joined Birmingham City's youth academy in 2002. He played in the club's under-18 team which reached the semi-final of the 2008–09 FA Youth Cup, in which they lost 6–1 on aggregate to their Liverpool counterparts.

Included in the squads for first-team pre-season friendlies, Preston injured a medial knee ligament playing for a reserve XI against Tamworth. Following an injury crisis, Preston, still in the second year of his academy scholarship, was given a squad number and made his first-team debut on 22 September 2009 as a second-half substitute in the League Cup third-round match at Sunderland, replacing the injured Stuart Parnaby in the 79th minute; he received a yellow card in stoppage time.

Hereford United (loan)
To gain first-team experience, Preston joined League Two club Hereford United on a one-month loan on 26 February 2010. He went straight into the starting eleven for the following day's visit to Notts County, which ended in a 5–0 defeat as goalkeeper Chris Adamson and defender Paul Downing were sent off and Preston himself was booked. After three more League Two appearances, the loan was extended for a second month. Preston returned to Birmingham at the end of his second month without making any more first-team appearances for Hereford.

He rejoined Hereford on a Football League youth loanan arrangement which allows the player to train with and play non-first-team matches for his parent club when not required by the loaning clubin January 2011 until the end of the 2010–11 season. He failed to make a first-team appearance and the loan was ended on 12 April. He was released when his contract expired at the end of the 2010–11 season.

AFC Telford United

Preston joined Conference Premier club AFC Telford United on 20 July 2011. After a successful first season with the club he was given a new one-year deal. It was announced on 3 May 2013 at the club's end of season awards that Preston would extend his contract with AFC Telford, despite the club being relegated to the Conference North.

Preston joined Conference North rivals Barrow on a one-month loan on 18 October 2013, with whom he made five appearances. He was soon loaned out again, joining Stourbridge of the Southern League Premier Division on 28 November. Preston made his debut for Stourbridge two days later in a 7–0 home victory over Weymouth. On 26 April 2014, he won promotion back to the Conference Premier with AFC Telford United at the first time of asking, after they clinched the Conference North title on the final day of the 2013–14 season, beating Gainsborough Trinity 3–0 at the New Bucks Head. Following their promotion, AFC Telford released Preston after three seasons with the club.

Tamworth
Preston signed for newly relegated Conference North team Tamworth on a one-year contract on 9 June 2014.

AFC Telford United
Preston returned to Telford in May 2016.

Leamington (loan)
On 6 December 2016, Dan joined Leamington on loan.

Hednesford Town (loan)
On 13 January 2017, Preston was again loaned out, this time to Hednesford Town.

Stourbridge (loan)
Preston signed for Stourbridge on loan from AFC Telford United on 24 February 2017.

Hereford
It was confirmed on 26 August 2017, that Preston had signed for Hereford.

Bromsgrove Sporting (dual registration)
Preston was confirmed as signing on dual registration for Bromsgrove Sporting on 12 January 2018, in a bid to help the player get some game time, and help him return to fitness.

Stratford Town
On 20 December 2018, Dan Preston signed for Southern League Premier Central side Stratford Town, and was joined on the same day by goalkeeper Matija Sarkic, who joined the club on loan from Aston Villa.

Preston made his debut for Stratford Town on 2 February 2019, in a home match against St Ives Town, the match finished 0–0.

Sutton Coldfield Town
On 16 March 2019, it was confirmed that Preston had signed for Southern League Division One Central side Sutton Coldfield Town.

Nuneaton Borough
On 27 June 2019, Dan signed for newly relegated Southern League Premier Central side Nuneaton Borough. With just one substitute appearance to his name, Preston left Nuneaton Borough on 30 August 2019.

Sutton Coldfield Town
On the same day, Preston resigned for Southern League Division One Central side Sutton Coldfield Town.

Bedworth United
Preston's move to Sutton Coldfield Town was short lived, as on the 12 September 2019, he was announced as part of a double signing for Southern League Division One Central side Bedworth United along with Blaize Punter.

Personal life
Preston was born in Birmingham, West Midlands, and brought up in the Kings Norton district of the city, where he attended St Thomas Aquinas School. In his final year, he helped the school football team to victory in the final of the 2008 Birmingham City Cup. His stepbrothers James and Mitchell McPike both turned professional with Birmingham CityMitchell also played for England at under-17 levelbut neither played for the first team.

Career statistics

Honours
AFC Telford United
Conference North: 2013–14

References

External links

1991 births
Living people
English footballers
Footballers from Birmingham, West Midlands
Association football defenders
Birmingham City F.C. players
Hereford United F.C. players
AFC Telford United players
Barrow A.F.C. players
Stourbridge F.C. players
Tamworth F.C. players
Leamington F.C. players
Hednesford Town F.C. players
Hereford F.C. players
Bromsgrove Sporting F.C. players
Stratford Town F.C. players
Sutton Coldfield Town F.C. players
Nuneaton Borough F.C. players
Bedworth United F.C. players
English Football League players
National League (English football) players
Southern Football League players